Yoy is a Tai language of Thailand and Laos. The Yoy language is now in the critical endangered state due to a rapid language shift, which may eventually lead to complete language loss.

Phonology 
The phonology of Yoy, according to Phakkahn (2017).

Consonants 

Only  occur in word-final position.

Some words show alternate pronunciations between the initial syllable consonants:
/jaːk⁵/ ~ /ɲaːk⁵/ to want
/jaːw²/ ~ /ɲaːw²/ long
/joːj⁴/ ~ /ɲoːj⁴/ Yoy

Vowels 

Yoy has two different phonemic vowel lengths. There are nine short vowels and nine long vowels. In the word-final open syllables, there is no contrast between short and long vowels, but in closed syllables and non-final open syllables, short and long vowels are distinctive.

Tones 
Yoy has five phonologically distinctive tones in non-checked syllables. Checked syllables in Yoy can carry only tone 1 (mid-leveled tone), tone 2 (high-rising tone), and tone 5 (low-falling creaky).

Vocabulary

Numberals

Verbs

Nouns

Adjectives

References 

Languages of Laos
Tai languages